Laurencin, real name Paul-Aimé Chapelle, (10 January 1806 - 9 December 1890) was a French playwright and librettist. 

He authored numerous theatre plays, vaudevilles and operettas, most of them in collaboration. Le 66 and Monsieur et Madame Denis by Jacques Offenbach are among the pieces he collaborated to.

19th-century French dramatists and playwrights
French opera librettists
1806 births
1890 deaths